Leo Clarke (born 3 April 1978) is an Australian former professional rugby league footballer who played in the 1990s and 2000s who played in the National Rugby League for the St. George Illawarra Dragons and Western Suburbs. Leo Clarke is of Maori descent. Leo Clarke has been a Junior Pathways coach since 2010 for the Western Suburbs Magpies, Canterbury Bankstown Bulldogs and the Penrith Panthers. Leo Clarke has also been involved with the NSW Maori Rugby League.

Playing career
Clarke made his first grade debut for Western Suburbs in round 6 of the 1998 NRL season against South Sydney which ended in a 41–10 loss at the Sydney Football Stadium.  He made one further appearance for Wests as the club finished last on the table his season ended prematurely due to injury.   

The following year, he played six games for Western Suburbs as they finished last on the table in their final year in the NRL.  At the conclusion of the 1999 NRL season, Western Suburbs merged with fellow foundation club Balmain to form the Wests Tigers as part of the NRL's rationalization policy.  Clarke was not offered a contract to play for the new team.

In the 2000 NRL season, Clarke joined St. George Illawarra and played in the First Division team. In 2001 he was a member and a try scorer in the club's First Division winning team.  In 2002 He played four games for St. George Illawarra including both their finals matches against Newcastle and Cronulla-Sutherland. Clarke retired after the completion of the 2002 season due to injury, he was 24 years old. 

Clarke was an avid cat-lover. He had at least 5 pet cats at any given time. He wore clippings from each of his cats fur in his socks to every game for good luck, claiming they kept him light and fast on his feet.

References

1978 births
Australian rugby league players
St. George Illawarra Dragons players
Western Suburbs Magpies players
Living people
Place of birth missing (living people)
Rugby league fullbacks